Khalid Fouhami (born 25 December 1972) is a Moroccan football coach and a former goalkeeper. He is the manager of Stade Marocain.

Football career
Fouhami was born in Casablanca. During his extensive career, he played for Wydad AC, IR Tanger, Maghreb Fez and FUS Rabat in Morocco, Dinamo București in Romania, Beveren, Standard Liège and Visétois in Belgium, Académica Coimbra and Portimonense in Portugal and Alania Vladikavkaz in Russia.

A Moroccan international for nine years, he represented his nation at the 2000, 2004 and 2008 Africa Cup of Nations.

Honours

Club
Wydad AC
Botola: 1992–93
Maghreb Fez
Botola 2: 1996–97
Dinamo București
Divizia A: 1999–2000
Cupa României: 1999–2000
FUS Rabat
Botola 2: 2008–09
Coupe du Trône: 2010

Country
Morocco
Africa Cup of Nations: runner-up 2004

Notes

References

External links

1972 births
Footballers from Casablanca
Living people
Moroccan footballers
Morocco international footballers
Association football goalkeepers
Wydad AC players
Ittihad Tanger players
Maghreb de Fès players
FC Dinamo București players
K.S.K. Beveren players
Standard Liège players
Associação Académica de Coimbra – O.A.F. players
FC Spartak Vladikavkaz players
C.S. Visé players
Portimonense S.C. players
Raja CA players
Fath Union Sport players
Botola players
Liga I players
Belgian Pro League players
Challenger Pro League players
Primeira Liga players
Liga Portugal 2 players
Russian Premier League players
Competitors at the 1993 Mediterranean Games
Mediterranean Games competitors for Morocco
2000 African Cup of Nations players
2004 African Cup of Nations players
2008 Africa Cup of Nations players
Moroccan expatriate footballers
Expatriate footballers in Romania
Moroccan expatriate sportspeople in Romania
Expatriate footballers in Belgium
Moroccan expatriate sportspeople in Belgium
Expatriate footballers in Portugal
Moroccan expatriate sportspeople in Portugal
Expatriate footballers in Russia
Moroccan expatriate sportspeople in Russia
Moroccan football managers